NGC 136 is an open cluster in the constellation Cassiopeia. It was discovered by William Herschel on November 26, 1788.

References 

Open clusters
Astronomical objects discovered in 1788
0136
Cassiopeia (constellation)